"Lipstick" is a song by the American alternative rock band Rocket from the Crypt, released as the second single from their 1998 album RFTC. It was released by Elemental Records in three versions: as a 7" vinyl single and as two different CD singles, each with a different track list. It was the only one of the album's three singles to chart, reaching #64 on the UK Singles Chart.

Track listing
All songs written by Rocket from the Crypt

7" version

Personnel
Speedo (John Reis) - guitar, lead vocals
ND (Andy Stamets) - guitar, backing vocals
Petey X (Pete Reichert) - bass, backing vocals
Apollo 9 (Paul O'Beirne) - saxophone, vibraslap, backing vocals
JC 2000 (Jason Crane) - trumpet, percussion, organ, backing vocals
Atom (Adam Willard) - drums, timbales
Kevin Shirley - recording, production, and mixing of "Lipstick", "Cheetah", and "Strangehold"
Mark Trombino - production and mixing of "Heads Are Gonna Roll"
Donnell Cameron - production of "Hot Heart"

Chart positions

References 

1998 singles
Rocket from the Crypt songs
Song recordings produced by Kevin Shirley